Group C of the 2007 Copa América was one of the three groups of competing nations in the 2007 Copa América. It comprised Argentina, Colombia, Paraguay and invitee United States. The group matches ran from 28 June to 5 July 2007.

Argentina and Paraguay advanced from the group to the knockout phase.

Standings

Matches
All times are in local, Venezuela Time (UTC−04:00).

Paraguay v Colombia

Argentina v United States

United States v Paraguay

Argentina v Colombia

Colombia v United States

Argentina v Paraguay

References

External links
2007 Copa América at RSSSF

Group C
Argentina at the 2007 Copa América
2007 in Paraguayan football
2007 in Colombian football
2007 in American soccer